The 2020 Sun Belt Conference men's soccer tournament was the 26th edition of the Sun Belt Conference Men's Soccer Tournament. The tournament decided the Sun Belt Conference (SBC) champion. The tournament began on November 11 and concluded on November 15, 2020.

Georgia State hosted the tournament, which consisted solely of a semifinal and final round. Coastal Carolina successfully defended their SBC Tournament championship, defeating Georgia State in penalties in the final.

The Sun Belt shuttered its men's soccer league after all of its members moved the sport to other conferences by the end of the 2020–21 school year. The conference had lost one men's soccer team before the season when full conference member Appalachian State dropped men's soccer in May 2020, citing financial impacts from COVID-19. That July saw associate member Howard announce that it would become an associate member of the Northeast Conference in six sports, with men's soccer being one of four sports moving in July 2021. In January 2021 the ASUN Conference announced three schools as incoming full members, including Sun Belt men's soccer associate Central Arkansas. The following month saw full Sun Belt member Coastal Carolina announce that it would become a single-sport member of Conference USA, joining another in-state associate member in South Carolina. This left Georgia Southern and Georgia State, both full Sun Belt members, as the conference's only remaining men's soccer programs, and those two schools announced they would move that sport to the Mid-American Conference in late May 2021.

However, following a major conference realignment that brought three new men's soccer schools (James Madison, Marshall, and Old Dominion) to the conference, SBC commissioner Keith Gill announced on November 1, 2021 that men's soccer would be reinstated no later than 2023. With all three schools joining in 2022 instead of the originally intended 2023 timeline, the SBC announced on April 6, 2022 that men's soccer would instead return in 2022.

Background 

The tournament served as the culmination of the SBC's regular season, which was extensively modified due to the ongoing COVID-19 pandemic. Four of the five SBC teams played in 2020, under a modified six-match conference season (three home, three away). All teams qualified for the SBC Tournament.

Seeds

Bracket

Schedule

Semifinals

Final

Statistics

Goalscorers 
2 Goals
  Marcello Jones – Coastal Carolina
  Marcelo Lage – Coastal Carolina
  Esteban Leiva – Coastal Carolina

1 Goal
  Alex Henderson – Georgia State
  Alberto Suarez – Central Arkansas

Honors

All Tournament Team 
 Sam Allardyce, Georgia Southern   
 Adam Davie, Georgia Southern
 Matthew Fearnley, Georgia State
 Alex Henderson, Georgia State      
 Ole Kjoerholt, Central Arkansas
 Marcello Jones, Coastal Carolina   
 Marcelo Lage, Coastal Carolina
 Esteban Leiva, Coastal Carolina   
 Ramon, Munoz, Georgia State
 Alberto Suarez, Central Arkansas      
 Tor Saunders, Coastal Carolina

References

External links 
 Sun Belt Tournament

2020
2020 in sports in Georgia (U.S. state)
Sun Belt Men's Soccer Tournament